The men's 400 metres hurdles event at the 1981 Summer Universiade was held at the Stadionul Naţional in Bucharest on 21 and 22 July 1981.

Medalists

Results

Heats
Held on 21 July

Semifinals
Held on 22 July

Final
Held on 22 July

References

Athletics at the 1981 Summer Universiade
1981